Between 1911 and 1913, the Acme Motor & Engineering Company of Lonsdale Street, Melbourne, Victoria, built motorcycles under the "Acme" brand name, using Fafnir and Moser engines in Chater-Lea frames.

References

Motorcycle manufacturers of Australia
Motorcycles of Australia
Motorcycles introduced in the 1910s